The Sony α9 (the α is sometimes spelled out as Alpha), Model ILCE-9, is a full-frame mirrorless interchangeable-lens camera. It was Sony's flagship camera as of 2017. The camera is not the successor to the α7 line of digital cameras but supplements it. Announced on 19 April 2017, the α9 is characterized by Sony as a true professional mirrorless camera system. The α9 is being compared with the Nikon D5 and the Canon EOS-1D X Mark II.

Sony initially priced the α9 at $4,499 with an availability date in May 2017.

The headline feature of the α9 is the 20 frames per second with a buffer of 240 raw or 362 JPEG images. This is accomplished without temporarily blacking out the finder for each exposure, unlike a DSLR.
Sony a9 was the first e-mount camera to use the larger NP-FZ100 battery with nearly double the capacity of the previous smaller NP-FW50 battery. 

The Sony α9 II, announced in October 2019, succeeds the α9. The new camera has updated ergonomics, connectivity, and a faster 10 fps burst with the mechanical shutter. Additionally, the α9 II breaks compatibility with the Memory Stick format; both slots are now SD and support the UHS-II protocol.

Features 
 Stacked Exmor RS CMOS Full-Frame sensor
 693-point focal-plane phase detection AF
 5-axis image stabilization
 LCD touchscreen (3 inch/7.5 cm) with tilt functionality
 3.68 Million dot Quad-VGA OLED 1.3 cm (0.5 inch) electronic viewfinder
 1200-zone evaluative light metering
 Built-in Wi-Fi, NFC and Bluetooth
 LAN input for transferring files via FTP
 LED-auto focus illuminator
 Multi Interface Shoe
 My Menu system with up to 72 assignable functions
 Joystick for positioning of the 693 focus points
 Dual memory card slots:
 α9: One for UHS-I and one for UHS-II.
 α9 II: Both support UHS-II.

Reception 
Initial hands-on of the α9 have been positive with multiple reviewers praising the company for listening to its users.

The α9 won Camera Grand Prix 2018 Camera of the Year.

See also
 List of Sony E-mount cameras
 Sony α7 II
 Sony α7 III
 Sony α7R II

References

External links 
 

Dpreview.com's Full Review of the Sony α9

α9
Cameras introduced in 2017
Full-frame mirrorless interchangeable lens cameras